The 1963 Washington Senators season involved the Senators finishing 10th in the American League with a record of 56 wins and 106 losses.

Offseason
 October 5, 1962: Paul Casanova was signed as a free agent by the Senators.
 November 26, 1962: 1962 first-year draft
Lou Piniella was drafted by the Senators from the Cleveland Indians.
Brant Alyea was drafted by the Senators from the Cincinnati Reds.
 Prior to 1963 season: Lou Klimchock was acquired by the Senators from the Milwaukee Braves.

Regular season
 September 2, 1963: Ed Hobaugh hit a home run in the last at bat of his career.

Season standings

Record vs. opponents

Notable transactions
 April 2, 1963: Minnie Miñoso was purchased by the Senators from the St. Louis Cardinals.
 May 6, 1963: Lou Klimchock was returned by the Senators to the Milwaukee Braves.
 May 8, 1963: Hobie Landrith was purchased by the Senators from the Baltimore Orioles.
 May 23, 1963: Jimmy Piersall was traded by the Senators to the New York Mets for Gil Hodges.
 June 24, 1963: Don Zimmer was purchased by the Senators from the Los Angeles Dodgers.

Roster

Player stats

Batting

Starters by position
Note: Pos = Position; G = Games played; AB = At bats; H = Hits; Avg. = Batting average; HR = Home runs; RBI = Runs batted in

Other batters
Note: G = Games played; AB = At bats; H = Hits; Avg. = Batting average; HR = Home runs; RBI = Runs batted in

Pitching

Starting pitchers
Note: G = Games pitched; IP = Innings pitched; W = Wins; L = Losses; ERA = Earned run average; SO = Strikeouts

Other pitchers
Note: G = Games pitched; IP = Innings pitched; W = Wins; L = Losses; ERA = Earned run average; SO = Strikeouts

Relief pitchers
Note: G = Games pitched; W = Wins; L = Losses; SV = Saves; ERA = Earned run average; SO = Strikeouts

Awards and honors
All-Star Game
Don Leppert, reserve

Farm system

References

External links
1963 Washington Senators team page at Baseball Reference
1963 Washington Senators team page at www.baseball-almanac.com

Texas Rangers seasons
Washington Senators season
Washing